Ben Granfelt (born 16 June 1963) is a guitarist from Helsinki, Finland and best known from his work in Leningrad Cowboys, Wishbone Ash, Gringos Locos, Guitar Slingers and his solo band Ben Granfelt Band.

Granfelt's most active and recent band named Ben Granfelt Band was formed in 1993 and since then they have toured clubs and festivals in Finland, United Kingdom, Germany, United States, Austria, Switzerland and United Arab Emirates where they appeared at the Abu Dhabi and Dubai Jazz Festivals. Ben's latest album True Colors was released in 2020.

Ben Granfelt Band began working on their 11th album in February 2010 but Granfelt's family issues forced him to put both the album and the band on hiatus in June 2010. Soon after making this decision, Granfelt was asked to join Finnish rock band Los Bastardos Finlandeses. It did not take long for Granfelt to join Los Bastardos Finlandeses full-time and contribute to songwriting for their next album.

Granfelt has achieved nidan (二段:にだん) second degree black belt in karate and black belt in Brazilian Jiu-Jitsu.

Equipment
Equipment as of 12/2009

Guitars
Fender -62 Strat Black
Fender -63 Strat Daphne Blue over sunburst
Fender -64 Strat Sherwood green (refinished)
Fender - 2007 NAMM limited edition relic Strat
Fender - 2004 Limited Edition black over sunburst relic Strat
Tyler SE - Shoreline gold
Tyler - Landau Classic
Gibson - Bonamassa Les Paul
Gibson - 61 Les Paul (SG model)
Gibson – 76 Les Paul Custom
Duck - BG Custom
Tyler – Burning Water
Gibson - 59 Historic Collection Les Paul

Main setup

The BIG RIG:
Made by Danish Steen Skrydstrup

Skrydstrup Custom Power Center
TC Electronic G-Force
TC Electronic 1210
H&K Rotosphere
Captain Coconut (Vibe, Fuzz, Octavia)
King Of Tone IV (boost and OD)
Discombobulator (Auto wah)
Skrydstrup Custom interface

Granfelt uses two amps either as A/B preamps or both amps' power sections in stereo. Currently Granfelt uses two Naylor SD60's amps or two ENGL Slow Hands amps. Cabinets are either two ENGL E112's or an ENGL Horizontal E212H cabinet in stereo. All cabinets are equipped with Celestion V30s speakers.
	
Pedalboard includes Buddah Wah, Roland Vol-pedal, SC-1 with EXT+, TC Electronic Polytune + power supply and Skrydstrup custom buffer.

	
The small pedal board:
Real McCoy wah
Captain Coconut
H&K Rotosphere
KOT
Skrydstrup Custom Power Supply
Skrydstrup buffer/line driver

Naylor Duel 38 amp and ENGL Classic head with two ENGL cabinets, one E112 and one C210.

Discography

Los Bastardos Finlandeses
Saved By Rock'n'Roll - 2011 100% Record Company
Day Of The Dead - 2013 Ranka Kustannus
BMF Ball - 2015 100% Record Company

Ben Granfelt (Band)
The Truth - 1994 Megamania
Radio Friendly - 1996 Megamania
LIVE - 1997 Megamania
E.G.O - 1999 Megamania
All I Want to Be - 2001 Megamania
The Past Experience - 2004 Megamania
Live Experience - 2006 Bonnier/Amigo
Sum of Memories - 2006 Bonnier/Amigo
Notes from the Road - 2007 Bonnier/Amigo
Kaleidoscope - 2009 Windseekers
Melodic Relief - 2012 Sprucefield
Handmade - 2014 Turenki Records
Live - 20th Anniversary Tour - 2015 Rokarola Records
Time Flies When You're Playing Guitar - 2016 Sprucefield

Gringos Locos
Gringos Locos - 1987 Mercury
Punch Drunk - 1989 Atlantic
Raw Deal - 1991 Fazer
Second Coming of Age - 2009 Windseekers

Wishbone Ash
Bona Fide, CD - 2002 Talking Elephant
Live in London and Beyond, DVD - 2003 Classic Rock
Phoenix Rising, DVD - 2004 Classic Rock

Guitar Slingers
Guitar Slingers - 1994 Sony
Song and Dance - 1996 Sony
That Little Something - 1998 Guitar Slinger Records
Guitar Slingers (Double-CD) - 1998 RAWK Records

Leningrad Cowboys
We Cum From Brooklyn - 1992 BMG
Total Balalaika Show - Helsinki Concert - 1993 BMG
Live in Prowinzz - 1993 BMG
Happy Together - 1994 BMG
Go Space - 1996 BMG

Filmography

Leningrad Cowboys Meet Moses (1994) film directed by Aki Kaurismäki.
Total Balalaika Show (1994) documentary directed by Aki Kaurismäki.

References

External links

[ edit]

Visit the Guitar Portal
 Ben Granfelt Band Official Website
 Ben Granfelt Band Official Myspace
 Ben Granfelt Band Facebook profile
 Los Bastardos Finlandeses Official Website

1963 births
Living people
musicians from Helsinki
Finnish guitarists
Finnish male guitarists
Wishbone Ash members
Swedish-speaking Finns